The Type 21 and Type 22 rocket-bombs were rocket artillery systems used by garrison troops of the Imperial Japanese Navy during the late stages of World War II in defense of island bases in the Pacific.

Design 
Instead of being a purpose-built artillery rocket the Type 21 and Type 22 rocket-bombs were a conversion of either a navy  Type 98 No.25 land bomb or Type 99 No.25 ordinary bomb model 1 bomb that had their tail cones removed and were fitted with solid-propellant rocket boosters. According to Japanese documentation, the combination of rocket booster plus a Type 98 bomb was designated Type 21 and the combination of a rocket booster plus a Type 99 bomb was designated Type 22.  Details on the Type 21/Type 22 were gathered from Japanese technical documents and analysis of a dud that was found during the war.            

The rocket booster was similar to the smaller Type 10 and 3, in that the rocket booster consisted of an adapter plate, propellant chamber, butt plate, tail cone, braced tail fins, and a single venturi.  However, with the Type 21/Type 22, the rocket motor is attached to the bomb with a different adapter plate for each type of bomb and the motor does not drop away when it burns out.  An adapter sleeve fits into the tail of the warhead and the forward end of the rocket motor and was riveted around the circumference joining the two.  In the center of the nose cap, there was a socket for a blasting cap that was electrically ignited by an umbilical cord that attached to the booster through a hole in the adapter sleeve.          

Type 21/Type 22 rocket-bombs were launched from crude V-shaped metal troughs similar to those used for the 19 cm rocket motors.  However, the sides of the Type 21/Type 22 launchers were flared outwards.  These launchers could be laid against earthen embankments or mounted on bipods.  There were rumors of a truck mounted version but an example of this system was not found.  Captured Japanese documentation claims the bombs are capable of a range of  but tests have shown a range of only .  The rocket can be easily recognized by a distinctive "bubble whistle" sound in flight.  The accuracy of the rocket is said to be poor and the flight path is erratic and susceptible to crosswinds.  They were not weapons that could be fired at a specific target but were instead fired towards a target and may have been more useful as a siege weapon.

Bombs 
Since two different types of bombs were converted to create the Type 21/Type 22 the overall weight should be considered as approximate because the weight of each bomb without its tail cone is not known.  The Type 98 No.25 land bomb was a thin-cased high explosive bomb for land targets while the Type 99 No.25 ordinary bomb model 1 was an armor-piercing bomb for use against warships.

Gallery

References

World War II artillery of Japan
Rocket artillery
300 mm artillery
Weapons and ammunition introduced in 1944